Zooko's triangle is a trilemma of three properties that some people consider desirable for names of participants in a network protocol:
 Human-meaningful: Meaningful and memorable (low-entropy) names are provided to the users.
 Secure: The amount of damage a malicious entity can inflict on the system should be as low as possible.
 Decentralized: Names correctly resolve to their respective entities without the use of a central authority or service.

Overview 
Zooko Wilcox-O'Hearn conjectured that no single kind of name can achieve more than two. For example: DNSSec offers a human-meaningful, secure naming scheme, but is not decentralized as it relies on trusted root-servers; .onion addresses and bitcoin addresses are secure and decentralized but not human-meaningful; and I2P uses name translation services which are secure (as they run locally) and provide human-meaningful names - but fail to provide unique entities when used globally in a decentralised network without authorities.

Solutions 
Several systems that exhibit all three properties of Zooko's triangle include:
 Computer scientist Nick Szabo's paper "Secure Property Titles with Owner Authority" illustrated that all three properties can be achieved up to the limits of Byzantine fault tolerance.
 Activist Aaron Swartz described a naming system based on Bitcoin employing Bitcoin's distributed blockchain as a proof-of-work to establish consensus of domain name ownership. These systems remain vulnerable to Sybil attack, but are secure under Byzantine assumptions.
 Theoretician Curtis Yarvin implemented a decentralized version of IP addresses in Urbit that hash to four-syllable, human-readable names.
Several platforms implement refutations of Zooko's conjecture, including: Twister (which use Swartz' system with a bitcoin-like system), Blockstack (separate blockchain), Namecoin (separate blockchain), LBRY (separate blockchain - content discovery, ownership, and peer-to-peer file-sharing), Monero, OpenAlias, Ethereum Name Service, and the Handshake Protocol.

See also 
 Petname
 GNU Name System
 CAP theorem

Notes

References

External links 
 Zooko Wilcox-O'Hearn, Names: Decentralized, Secure, Human-Meaningful: Choose Two – the essay highlighting this difficulty
 Marc Stiegler, An Introduction to Petname Systems – a clear introduction
 Nick Szabo, Secure Property Titles – argues that all three properties can be achieved up to the limits of Byzantine fault tolerance.
 Bob Wyman, The Persistence of Identity (Updating Zooko's Pyramid)
 Paul Crowley, Squaring Zooko's Triangle
 Aaron Swartz, Squaring the Triangle using a technique from Bitcoin

Secure communication
Decentralization